Kerei is a Kazakh tribe that originated in the Altay region and fled into modern-day Kazakhstan in the early 13th century after being defeated by Genghis Khan.

See also
 Qarai Turks
 Kazakhs

References

Turkic peoples of Asia
Ethnic groups in China